Woodfield railway station served the area of Lockwood, Kirklees, England, in 1874 on the Meltham branch line.

History
The station was opened on 1 June 1874 by the Lancashire and Yorkshire Railway. It was an extremely short-lived station, only being open for one month before closing on 1 July 1874.

References 

Disused railway stations in West Yorkshire
Former Lancashire and Yorkshire Railway stations
Railway stations in Great Britain opened in 1874
Railway stations in Great Britain closed in 1874
1874 establishments in England
1874 disestablishments in England